The 1930 Richmond Spiders football team was an American football team that represented the University of Richmond as a member of the Virginia Conference during the 1930 college football season. Led by 17th-year head coach, Frank Dobson, Richmond compiled an overall record of 2–4–2.

Schedule

References

Richmond
Richmond Spiders football seasons
Richmond Spiders football